This list is of Major Sites Protected for their Historical and Cultural Value at the National Level in the Municipality of Tianjin, People's Republic of China.

 
 
 
 
  
 
 

|}

See also

 Principles for the Conservation of Heritage Sites in China
 Tianjin Museum

References

Tianjin